"Me and Maxine" is a song recorded by American country music artist Sammy Kershaw.  It was released in November 1999 as the third single from the album Maybe Not Tonight.  The song reached #35 on the Billboard Hot Country Singles & Tracks chart.  The song was written by Gordon Bradberry and Michael Lunn.

Chart performance

References

1999 singles
1999 songs
Sammy Kershaw songs
Song recordings produced by Keith Stegall
Mercury Records singles